"Free Family Portrait Studio" is the twenty-fourth episode and season finale of the eighth season of the American comedy television series The Office, and the show's 176th episode overall. The episode originally aired on NBC on May 10, 2012. "Free Family Portrait Studio" was written and directed by B. J. Novak, who also wrote and directed the season premiere "The List". The episode guest stars Andy Buckley, Jack Coleman, Sendhil Ramamurthy, Jerry Minor, and Michael Schur.

The series—presented as if it were a real documentary—depicts the everyday lives of office employees in the Scranton, Pennsylvania, branch of the fictional Dunder Mifflin Paper Company. In the episode, David Wallace (Andy Buckley) helps Andy Bernard (Ed Helms) go undercover and stage a coup, and a new opportunity arises for Robert California (James Spader).

"Free Family Portrait Studio" received mixed reviews from critics, with many noting that the episode did not feel like a proper season finale. It was viewed by 4.49 million viewers and received a 2.3 rating/6% share among adults between the age of 18 and 49.  The episode ranked third in its timeslot and was also the highest-rated NBC series of the night.

Synopsis 
Dwight Schrute (Rainn Wilson) offers free family portraits in the office, and many members of the office take advantage of the opportunity, including Creed Bratton (Creed Bratton) with his very elderly parents, Toby Flenderson (Paul Lieberstein) with his teenage daughter Sasha, Meredith Palmer (Kate Flannery) with her teenage son, Kelly Kapoor (Mindy Kaling) with Ravi (Sendhil Ramamurthy), a desperate Ryan Howard (B. J. Novak) holding up various signs to try to win back Kelly's affection yet again, and Pam Halpert (Jenna Fischer) with a reluctant Jim (John Krasinski) and their children Cece and Philip. Senator Robert Lipton (Jack Coleman) later comes by with his and Angela Martin's (Angela Kinsey) son Philip to also get a family portrait. Jim suspects that Dwight's motive for giving away family portraits was to get revenge on Jim for a prank involving a fake Velcro suit, but Dwight's real motive was to try to get some of Philip Lipton's DNA to run a test to determine who Philip's actual father is. Angela is very much against this idea and tries to ensure that Dwight does not get the opportunity. After taking the pictures, Robert notices that Philip's diaper is full, so he goes to change him. After doing so Dwight goes into the bathroom to retrieve the diaper, but Angela chases after him as he makes a break for the hospital to run the DNA test. Dwight and Angela then take part in a high-speed car chase until Dwight calls his cousin Mose (Michael Schur) to take her off his trail with a duplicate Trans Am. Angela later finds him in the hospital waiting area, where he confirms he is going to be there for the entire 72-hour waiting period for the DNA results. After she sits down, holding his hand, Dwight begins kissing her and Angela briefly demurs before passionately kissing him in return.

Andy Bernard (Ed Helms) comes into the office, wearing shabby clothing, and walks straight into manager Nellie Bertram's (Catherine Tate) office and pleads for a job. She eventually caves and makes him janitor for the day. Later, Andy admits in a talking head interview that he has actually convinced former CFO David Wallace (Andy Buckley) to buy Dunder Mifflin from Sabre and then make him the regional manager yet again; Andy is wearing the shabby clothing and making himself smell of alcohol in order to make everyone believe that he is doing poorly, and does embarrassing things such as spilling soup on himself throughout the day, wanting a "delicious moment" when he goes from janitor to regional manager. Erin Hannon (Ellie Kemper), secretly aware of the plan, becomes concerned, unsure if Andy will be able to recover from this image even after he becomes manager. Andy becomes very dependent on David arriving at the office until David calls him to say that he cannot make it until the next Friday. Andy then announces the plan and upon hearing this everyone, even Erin, assumes that Andy's conversations with David are hallucinations because none of them have seen Andy talking with David. However, David surprisingly shows up to the office and assures everyone that he is indeed buying Dunder Mifflin from Sabre with the $20 million that he got from selling a toy-vacuum invention called "Suck-it" to the United States Military. Andy goes through with his "delicious moment" plan, but no one seems to take much care, as they are more interested in the news of ownership, ruining Andy's moment. David also reveals that Jo Bennett is planning on liquidating the rest of Sabre. Upon hearing this news, Sabre CEO Robert California (James Spader) approaches David in an oddly excitable tone, introducing himself as "Bob Kazamakis" and takes him to the conference room to negotiate.

When Andy is reinstated as manager, he relishes the "delicious moment" he can have when he fires Nellie, but she begs him by reciting Shakespeare's quality of mercy quote from The Merchant of Venice. Frustrated that he cannot have his moment, but taking pity on her, Andy gives Nellie a new job as special projects manager. Robert later tells the office that he will be leaving for the next three years and going to "help" undereducated high school gymnasts, mostly Eastern European, with matching funds of one million dollars, which he convinces David to donate, disgusting the rest of the office. He then exits the office once and for all by giving Andy a kiss, possibly as a symbol of his power being regained, putting his arm around Andy and declaring to the office that "It's been a great year."

Former warehouse workers and lottery winners Calvin (Calvin Tenner) and Hide (Hidetoshi Imura) approach Darryl Philbin (Craig Robinson) asking for their jobs back as they made a bad investment in an energy drink for Asian homosexuals (which Robert is later seen drinking, and complains about the "coconut" flavor in the "coconut penis"). Darryl accepts them back and shows them around the warehouse and introduces them to new foreman Val (Ameenah Kaplan). Val's boyfriend, Brandon (Jerry Minor), is also there with her and notices the blatant compliments that Darryl gives to Val. Brandon then tells Darryl off which he responds to by just simply walking away. Later, Darryl and his daughter, Jada, are taking pictures at the family portrait studio; Val joins them and holds Darryl's hand.

At the end of the episode, Robert Lipton walks out of the building with Philip and he notices Oscar Martinez (Oscar Nunez). Robert asks why Oscar did not call after the fundraiser and heavily hints at his attraction to Oscar, which Oscar has repeatedly suggested to be the case. Oscar appears taken aback, but flattered and tempted.

Production
"Free Family Portrait Studio" was written and directed by executive producer B. J. Novak, who also portrays Ryan Howard in the series, marking the last of his 15 writing and five directing credits for the series as Novak ended his day-to-day involvement with the series before Season 9 to work on "The Mindy Project". The episode features the third consecutive appearance of the character David Wallace (Andy Buckley), former CFO of Dunder Mifflin, the seventh appearance of Jack Coleman as Angela's husband, State Senator Robert Lipton, the second appearance of Sendhil Ramamurthy as Kelly's boyfriend Ravi, having previously appeared in the episode "Angry Andy", and the second appearance of former Saturday Night Live cast member Jerry Minor as Val's boyfriend Brandon, having previously appeared in the episode "After Hours". Former Office writer/producer Michael Schur appears as Dwight's cousin Mose for the 10th time, and the first since the episode "Garden Party" earlier in the season. James Spader, who portrayed Robert California, made his final appearance for the eighth season.

The Season Eight DVD contains a number of deleted scenes from this episode. Notable cut scenes include Robert complimenting Jim and Pam's marriage and admitting his desire to share in their love, which the two take as a metaphorical compliment, Jim receiving a text from Robert asking him if Pam and he are free at 10 the following Friday which causes the two to think that California literally wants to be a part of their relationship, Pam trying to reassure Jim that Robert's odd behavior is a figment of their imagination, and Robert calling off the get-together due to this resignation as CEO of Sabre. Jim, out of curiosity, asks him what he was planning, to which he replies "a three-way".

Reception

Ratings
"Free Family Portrait Studio" originally aired on NBC in the United States on May 10, 2012. The episode was viewed by 4.49 million viewers and received a 2.3 rating/6% share among adults between the ages of 18 and 49. This means that it was seen by 2.3% of all 18- to 49-year-olds, and 7% of all 18- to 49-year-olds watching television at the time of the broadcast. The episode stayed even in the ratings from the previous episode, "Turf War". The episode finished third in its time slot, being beaten by Grey's Anatomy which received a 3.5 rating/10% share and the CBS drama Person of Interest which received a 2.6 rating/7% share in the 18–49 demographic. The episode beat the Fox series Touch and The CW drama series The Secret Circle. Despite this, "Free Family Portrait Studio" was the highest-rated NBC television episode of the night. 2.20 million viewers saw the episode through DVR, bringing the viewing total to 6.69 million viewers.

Reviews
"Free Family Portrait Studio" received mixed reviews from critics. Myles McNutt from The A.V. Club wrote that "Free Family Portrait Studio" proved to be "a disheartening conclusion to the show’s worst season, offering little optimism to sustain our already dwindling enthusiasm over the summer months." He continued to say that the season made him have little interest in "seeing anything further from Andy Bernard". Despite this, he complimented the Dwight subplot due to its slight connection to real human emotions. He ultimately gave the episode a C+. HitFix reviewer Alan Sepinwall wrote that he hoped the new showrunner, following Paul Lieberstein, would undo the developments made in the finale, criticizing the season's run of Andy Bernard as manager and Nellie Bertram's character. He also wrote that he would only view the first handful of episodes, due to the new showrunner and the hope that the season would improve. Cindy White of IGN wrote that the episode "hit all the marks" as a season finale, and said she was happy that Sabre was finally gone from the series. She complimented the good writing and character moments, but criticized the possible return of Nellie and the handling of the Angela-Dwight storyline over the season. She ultimately gave the episode an 8.0/10, calling it "great". Additionally, multiple critics criticized Andy's over-dramatization while trying to make a comeback to Dunder Mifflin.

References

External links
"Free Family Portrait Studio" at NBC.com

The Office (American season 8) episodes
2012 American television episodes